The 2011–12 ECHL season was the 24th season of the ECHL.  The regular season schedule ran from October 4, 2011 to March 31, 2012 and was followed by the 2012 Kelly Cup playoffs beginning on April 2, 2012.

League business

Team changes 
Following the loss of the Victoria Salmon Kings at the end of the 2010–11 season, the league welcomed as its 19th and 20th teams, the Chicago Express, who played home games at the Sears Centre in Hoffman Estates, Illinois and the Colorado Eagles, who moved to the ECHL from the Central Hockey League and played home games at the Budweiser Events Center in Loveland, Colorado. Chicago played in the North Division of the Eastern Conference and Colorado played in the Mountain Division of the Western Conference.

On July 6, 2011 the New Jersey Devils announced that the Trenton Devils were suspending operations immediately, citing a desire to restructure their player development system to more closely mirror those of other NHL franchises. New Jersey was the only NHL team to wholly own its ECHL affiliate. Trenton had failed to qualify for the playoffs for three out of the previous four seasons and had regularly posted league-low attendance numbers. Prior to folding, the team lost $1.5 million during the 2010–11 ECHL season. Later on July 27, an announcement was made that a Trenton franchise would re-enter the ECHL for the 2011–12 season as the Trenton Titans, with a press conference officially announcing the team occurring on July 28. The ECHL Board of Governors announced on July 28 that the Titans' membership application had been approved. The team took over the Trenton Devils' place in the Eastern Conference's Atlantic Division and played according to the Devils' original schedule for the 2011–12 season.

Annual Board of Governors meeting
The league's annual Board of Governors meeting concluded on August 1, 2011. Announcements included the re-election of Steve Chapman, president of the Gwinnett Gladiators as board president; adoption by the league of an attainable icing rule similar to that employed by the NHL and the league re-alignment for the 2011–12 season. The Colorado Eagles joined the Western Conference's Mountain Division, while in the Eastern Conference, the Wheeling Nailers moved to the Atlantic Division and the Chicago Express occupied the North Division spot left vacant by the Nailers.
The league also announced that no All-Star game would be conducted during the 2011–12 season.

2012 Kelly Cup Playoffs format 

The format for the 2011 Kelly Cup Playoffs remained unchanged from the previous season.

In the Eastern Conference, postseason berths were awarded to the first-place team in each division and the next five teams in the conference, based on points. The division winners were seeded first, second and third and played the eighth-place finisher, the seventh-place finisher and the sixth-place finisher, respectively, while the fourth-place finisher and the fifth-place finisher met. The conference semifinals had the winner of the first-place and eighth-place matchup meet the winner of the fourth-place and fifth-place game while the winner of the second-place and seventh-place game faced the winner of the third-place and sixth-place matchup.

In the Western Conference, postseason berths were awarded to the first-place team in each division and the next five teams in the conference, based on points. The division winner with the best record in the conference received a bye in the first round. The other division winner was seeded second and met the team that finished seventh in the conference in the first round. The other first round matchups were the third-place finisher in the conference against the sixth-place finisher in the conference and the fourth-place finisher in the conference against the fifth-place finisher in the conference. The conference semifinals had the first-place finisher meet the winner of the fourth-place and fifth-place matchup and the winner of the second-place finisher and seventh-place finisher against the winner of the third-place finisher and the sixth-place finisher.

The first round in each Conference was a best of five series with each subsequent round being a best of seven series.

Regular season

Standings

By division 
End of season standings
Eastern Conference

Western Conference

By conference 
End of season standings

* – Division leader; y – Won division; z – Won conference (and division)

* – Division leader; y – Won division; b – Won Brabham Cup, best record in the league and first round bye

2011–12 Kelly Cup Playoffs

Player statistics

Scoring leaders 
The following were the top ten players in the league in points at the conclusion of the 2011–12 season.

  
GP = Games played; G = Goals; A = Assists; Pts = Points; PIM = Penalty minutes

Leading goaltenders 
The following were the top ten goaltenders in the league in goals against average at the conclusion of the 2011–12 season.

GP = Games played; Min = Minutes played; W = Wins; L = Losses; OTL = Overtime losses; SOL = Shootout losses; GA = Goals against; SO = Shutouts; SV% = Save percentage; GAA = Goals against average

ECHL awards

All-ECHL Teams

ECHL All-Rookie Team

References

See also 
2011 in sports
2012 in sports

 
2011-12
3